Hiljaiset Levyt is an independent record label from Finland.  It was founded in the mid-1980s by Jukka Junttila. Hiljaiset Levyt is based in Tampere.

Hiljaiset Levyt is in specializing in punk, but has put out also kind of music.

Hiljaiset Levyt is the longest continues publishing independent record label in Finland.

Artists

 Alice in Wasteland
 Alivaltiosihteeri
 Attila the Stockbroker
 Burning Pipe Harmony
 Butchers
 Charming Disappointment
 Danny Punk
 Garbagemen
 God's Lonely Men
 Hundred Million Martians
 Jahnukaiset
 Jalla Jalla
 Johnny Spunky
 Juggling Jugulars
 Kamikaze Pilots
 Kätyrit
 Lowdown Shakin' Chills
 Maaseudun Tulevaisuus
 Mahtavat Lämpöpussit
 Many Hates
 Mickey Jupp
 Mothers Against Sex Association
 Mäkkelä
 Nightingales
 Phantom Tones
 Punk Lurex OK
 Ravin' Seeds
 Rehtorit
 Room 100
 Tina
 T. V. Smith
 Underclass
 Uutiset ja Sää
 Viewmasters
 Wolfmen
 Zägä Box

See also
 List of record labels

References

External links
 

Finnish independent record labels
Indie rock record labels